The Clinton, Iowa Riverfront, (also known as The Dike by Clintonians) is an area by the Mississippi River in Clinton, Iowa, United States, The riverfront is home to one of Clinton's main attractions the Clinton Area Showboat Theatre. There is a band shell with tennis courts, a child-friendly park, restaurants, an aquatic center, and skate park. Clinton, Iowa is located on the Mississippi River with Illinois opposite on the river.

The Riverfront was built as a solution from the result of a 1965 flood that flooded half of Clinton. Damages were estimated to be five million dollars. Since, it has been put in place, Clinton has been protected from further damage.

In 2005, the City of Clinton was awarded one of the Iowa Great Places Destination grant; A grant that was worth one million dollars to improve the riverfront. With the funds, Clinton updated the existing dike, with parks, recreation, and riverside views.

The Riverfront has parks, food, ball games, shows, and a restaurant called Candlelight Inn that overlooks the Mississippi. Parks include Riverfront Park, Skate Park, and the baseball park known as NelsonCorp Field.

During the summer, people ride their bikes on the bike path, play tennis, swim at the Riverview Pool, eat lunch at the picnic tables, go fishing, use the boat dock and the marina to go out on their boats, camp at the campground, and visit the band shell when there are concerts.

Clinton Showboat Theatre 
The Clinton Area Showboat Theatre was built in 1935. It was created to be a working boat but was converted into a showboat. The boat uses 25-75 tons of coal each day. The city of Clinton bought it in 1966. The cost for an adult season pass is $100. Shows include Forever Plaid, Godspell, The Sound of Music, She Loves Me, and Almost Main.

NelsonCorp Field
Clinton LumberKings are the minor league baseball team in Clinton. They have baseball games in the summer. The LumberKings and the Ashford Saints use NelsonCorp Field for their home games. LumberKings are the single A affiliate of the Seattle Mariners.

Discovery Trail 
The Discovery Trail is a 4.8 mile trail along the riverfront, dedicated to three Clinton county astronauts. It is open all year round and all hours of the day, and is free.

References 

Clinton, Iowa